Schizomyia is a genus of gall midges. It has a cosmopolitan distribution.

This genus is in the tribe Schizomyiina of the tribe Asphondyliini of the family Cecidomyiinae.

Species
These 50 species belong to the genus Schizomyia:

 Schizomyia acaciae Mani, 1934 c g
 Schizomyia acalyphae Felt, 1918 c g
 Schizomyia altifila (Felt, 1907) i c g
 Schizomyia assamensis Felt, 1920 c g
 Schizomyia botellus Dorchin & Freidberg g
 Schizomyia caryaecola Felt, 1908 i c g
 Schizomyia cheriani Mani, 1936 c g
 Schizomyia cissusaeflorae Mani, 1986 c g
 Schizomyia clerodendri Mani, 1986 c g
 Schizomyia cocculi Mani, 1954 c g
 Schizomyia cryptostegiae Gagne, 1997 c g
 Schizomyia diplodisci Felt, 1918 c g
 Schizomyia ericae Rubsaamen, 1915 c g
 Schizomyia eupatoriflorae (Beutenmuller, 1907) i c g b
 Schizomyia galiorum Kieffer, 1889 c g — Europe, Algeria, Kazakhstan. Hosts: Galium spp.
 Schizomyia impatientis (Osten Sacken, 1862) i c g b
 Schizomyia incerta Kieffer, 1909 c g
 Schizomyia indica Kieffer, 1909 c g
 Schizomyia ipomoeae Felt, 1910 c g
 Schizomyia laporteae Felt, 1921 c g
 Schizomyia loroco Gagne, 2008 c g
 Schizomyia macarangae Nayar, 1953 c g
 Schizomyia macrocapillata Maia, 2005 c g
 Schizomyia macrofila (Felt, 1907) i c g b
 Schizomyia maeruae Felt, 1926 c g
 Schizomyia manihoti Tavares, 1925 c g
 Schizomyia mimosae Tavares, 1925 c g
 Schizomyia nodosa Felt, 1921 c g
 Schizomyia orientalis Grover, 1966 c g
 Schizomyia petiolicola Felt, 1908 i c g
 Schizomyia psoraleae Rübsaamen, 1910 c g
 Schizomyia racemicola (Osten Sacken, 1862) i c g b
 Schizomyia rivinae Felt, 1908 i c g
 Schizomyia rubi (Felt, 1907) i c g
 Schizomyia samaralukensis Fedotova, 2007 c g
 Schizomyia scheppigi Rübsaamen, 1910 c g
 Schizomyia sesami Barnes, 1939 c g
 Schizomyia speciosa Felt, 1914 i c g
 Schizomyia spherica Maia & Oliveira, 2007 c g
 Schizomyia stachytarphetae Barnes, 1932 c g
 Schizomyia tami Kieffer, 1902 c g
 Schizomyia tuiuiu Urso-Guimaraes & de Souza Amorim, 2002 c g
 Schizomyia umbellicola (Osten Sacken, 1878) i c g
 Schizomyia variicornis (Kieffer, 1913) c g
 Schizomyia verbesinae b
 Schizomyia viburni Felt, 1908 i c g
 Schizomyia villebrunneae Felt, 1921 c g

Former species
 Ampelomyia viticola (Osten Sacken, 1862) i c g b — Eastern Nearctic. Hosts: Vitis (grape tube gallmaker)
 Ampelomyia vitiscoryloides (Packard) i c g b
 Ampelomyia vitispomum (Osten Sacken, 1878) i c g b

Data sources: i = ITIS, c = Catalogue of Life, g = GBIF, b = Bugguide.net

References

External links

Cecidomyiinae
Cecidomyiidae genera
Taxa named by Jean-Jacques Kieffer